La trepadora ("The Climber") is a 1944 Mexican film. It stars Sara García.

External links
 

1944 films
1940s Spanish-language films
Mexican black-and-white films
Films based on Venezuelan novels
Mexican drama films
1944 drama films
1940s Mexican films